Czastary is a village in Wieruszów County, Łódź Voivodeship, in central Poland. It is the seat of the gmina (administrative district) called Gmina Czastary.

The village has a population of 1,024.

References

Czastary
Kalisz Governorate
Łódź Voivodeship (1919–1939)